Cedar Creek Canyon may refer to:

Cedar Creek Canyon (Arkansas), in the Petit Jean State Park
Cedar Creek Canyon (Indiana), a glacial tunnel valley near Fort Wayne, Indiana